Patrik Rikl (born 6 January 1999) is a Czech tennis player.

Rikl won the 2016 French Open boys' doubles title alongside Israeli Yshai Oliel. The pair defeated Chung Yun-seong and Orlando Luz in the final.

Rikl is the son of Czech former tennis player David Rikl.

Junior Grand Slam finals

Boys' Doubles 2:(1 title, 1 runner-up)

ATP Challenger and ITF Futures finals

Singles: 7 (5–2)

Doubles: 14 (6–8)

References

External links
 
 
 Official website

1999 births
Living people
Czech male tennis players
Tennis players from Prague
Sportspeople from Bradenton, Florida
French Open junior champions
Grand Slam (tennis) champions in boys' doubles